Joanne Ruth Charlotte Accom (born 13 November 1978), mononymously known as Joanne, is an Australian singer-songwriter.

Career 
Joanne's first single, "Jackie", was released in late 1998. It reached No. 3 on the ARIA Charts, and became the highest selling single in Australia by an Australian artist during the 12-month period of eligibility for the 1999 ARIA Music Awards. For "Jackie", Joanne was credited as B.Z. featuring Joanne or Joanne/BZ, referring to the original performers of the song, Blue Zone.

She released the singles "Pack Your Bags" and "Are You Ready" in 1999.

Her next release was featuring on the track "Breakin' There's No Stoppin' Us" by Ilanda for The Wog Boy Movie in 2000.

Her solo album, Do Not Disturb, was released in 2001 after being a work in progress for two and a half years. It features a remix of "Jackie", her two singles released in 1999 and three new singles, "So Damn Fine", "I Don't Know", and "Busted". It was produced and recorded in Dance World Studios, South Melbourne.

Performances 
She performed a number of her hits at Melbourne's Rumba along with other artists on Saturday 17 November 2001 at the Docklands Stadium.

She performed her hit "So Damn Fine" in front of a live audience across Australia at one of the Big Brother Australia 2001 live eviction shows during the closing credits.

Joanne joined the Vengaboys 2016 National Tour as a 'special local guest' alongside Tina Cousins, Sonique and Whigfield.

Joanne performed a number of her songs, including hit single "Jackie" and a selection of cover versions including C+C Music Factory's "Gonna Make You Sweat (Everybody Dance Now)" at the Pump '90s dance party at ARQ in Sydney on 8 April 2017.

Joanne featured on a duet version of Janet Jackson's "Together Again" with Australian singer Greg Gould for his 2020 duets album 1998.

Discography

Studio albums

Singles

Awards and nominations

ARIA Music Awards
The ARIA Music Awards is an annual awards ceremony that recognises excellence, innovation, and achievement across all genres of Australian music.

|-
| 1999
| "Jackie""
| ARIA Award for Highest Selling Single
| 
|-

References

External links 
 Joanne Accom profile at DiscoGS.com

1978 births
Living people
Australian people of South African descent
Australian dance musicians
ARIA Award winners
Australian women pop singers
21st-century Australian women singers